Lummi Island lies at the southwest corner of Whatcom County, Washington, United States, between the mainland part of the county and offshore San Juan County. The Lummi Indian Reservation is situated on a peninsula east of the island, but it does not include Lummi Island. The population nearly doubles in summer when second-home owners from  Canada and the U.S. arrive for the summer months. 

The island is accessible by a 20-car ferry, the Whatcom Chief, run by Whatcom County Public Works. It is a 6-minute passage from Gooseberry Point on the mainland to the island. 

Public education for island residents is provided by the Ferndale School District. It operates one elementary school (K-5) on the island, Beach Elementary School. Middle and high school students must travel to attend schools on the mainland.

History
The island was originally called Sa nam a o ("High Mountain") and Skallaham by the native Lummi people.  

In 1792 Spanish explorers dubbed it Isla de Pacheco, and British colonists later called it McLoughlin Island.  In 1853, the U.S. National Geodetic Survey charted the island as Lummi, naming it after the local tribe. Later British Canadians and Americans adopted this term. Some theories suggest the name was derived from a Lummi-language word.

The island's post office was established by the United States government in 1882. At that time the town and post office were named "Beach", but today island mail is addressed to "Lummi Island, Washington". The Beach School and Beach Store Cafe have retained the older name.

By 1919, the Nooksack Fish Packing Company had a cannery on the island at Sunrise Cove.

Lummi Island Quarry
A rock quarry on the island was operated intermittently, but major operations started in 1964. By 1990 the pit was 3 acres, and mining rights were sold to James and Kyle Bride of Everett, Washington. The operation became Ace Rock, LLC in 1997, with the Brides, Dick Christopherson (Bremerton, Washington), and David Grainger (British Columbia, Canada). The underlying land was sold in 1999 to the Brides and Christopherson. In 2005, Valley View Sand and Gravel, Inc. (owned by the three families) assumed ownership of the land.

The Lummi Island Quarry was operated until 2013 by Aggregates West, Inc. of Everson, owned by Grainger. Aggregates West went into Chapter 11 bankruptcy, having defaulted in 2012 on $3.5 million in Frontier Bank (inherited by Union Bank) loans originated in 2005. Aggregates West offloaded barges of excavated rock at Bellingham, Anacortes, Everett, and Seattle). By 2007 only 10% of the output was used on the island. 

Lummi Island Heritage Trust, a land trust, sought to purchase the land for reclamation and conservation purposes. The trust successfully purchased the 105 acres in 2015 for $1.08 million. The purchase was also supported by Whatcom County, Puget Sound marine and Nearshore Grant Program, and the Rose Foundation, to restore the property. Some is still covered with forests and there are 4,000 feet of shoreline. 

By 2019 the land trust named the area the Aiston Preserve, after an Aiston family that homesteaded the land in the 1940s.

Culture
Lummi Island is best known for its unique reef net salmon fishery developed by the indigenous Lummi of the area. It has an eclectic population of artists, seascapes, and rural settings. The island's narrow, scenic and winding roads are popular with bicyclers. A trail to Lummi Mountain takes hikers through the Baker Preserve to stunning high views of the San Juan and Gulf Islands. The trail is maintained by the Lummi Island Heritage Trust.

Facilities on the island include a general store, two restaurants, several bed and breakfast houses, a small library, a post office, a fire station, a church, a Salvation Army camp, and a vintage 1919 elementary school. The historic Lummi Island Congregational Church has a quiet, wooded cemetery. The Beach Store Cafe is a popular local hangout with a small bar and traditional café fare. 

The Willows Inn, opened in 1910, was upgraded to a fine dining restaurant in 2010 under chef Blaine Wetzel, who co-owns it. Restaurant employees complained about workplace conditions, and in 2017 the restaurant was fined by the United States Department of Labor and required to end its internship program.  In late 2022, after allegations of abuse were again reported and settled, the Inn was closed and according to reports will be donated to a local non-profit.

Events
The island hosts a weekly farmers' market in the spring and summer, a chili festival in mid-July, and a Christmas party for island children.

Lummi Island is home to numerous artists. Some conduct studio tours on Memorial Day weekend, Labor Day weekend, and the second weekend in November.

Climate
The climate in this area has mild differences between highs and lows, with wet winters and dry summers. According to the Köppen Climate Classification system, Lummi Island has a marine west coast climate, abbreviated "Cfb" on climate maps.

Transportation

The Whatcom Chief is a ferry that transports vehicles and passengers from Lummi Island to Gooseberry Point. It is run by the county government and can carry 100 passengers and 20 vehicles.

In the 1950s, Whatcom County proposed the construction of a bridge to replace the ferry service. The state government also authorized Washington State Ferries to run a ferry between Lummi and Orcas islands following the completion of the bridge.

References

External links
Lummi Island CCD, Whatcom County, Washington United States Census Bureau
Lummi Island Heritage
Commercial Fishing: Reef net, A fishing method practiced by the Indians of Puget Sound.

Landforms of Whatcom County, Washington
Islands of Washington (state)
Washington Natural Areas Program
Protected areas of Whatcom County, Washington
Pacific islands of Washington (state)
Washington placenames of Native American origin